Ioannis Agorastos "John" Plagis, DSO, DFC & Bar (1919–1974) was a Southern Rhodesian flying ace in the Royal Air Force (RAF) during the Second World War, noted especially for his part in the defence of Malta during 1942. The son of Greek immigrants, he was accepted by recruiters only after Greece joined the Allies in late 1940. Following spells with No. 65 Squadron and No. 266 (Rhodesia) Squadron, he joined No. 249 (Gold Coast) Squadron in Malta in March 1942. Flying Spitfire Mk Vs, Plagis was part of the multinational group of Allied pilots that successfully defended the strategically important island against numerically superior Axis forces over the next few months. Flying with No. 185 Squadron from early June, he was withdrawn to England in early July 1942.

After a spell as an instructor in the UK, Plagis returned to action in September 1943 as commander of No. 64 Squadron, flying Spitfire Mk VCs over northern France. He took command of No. 126 (Persian Gulf) Squadron in June 1944, and led many attacks on German positions during the invasion of France and the campaign that followed; he was shot down over Arnhem during Operation Market Garden, but only lightly wounded. After converting to Mustang IIIs, he commanded a wing based at RAF Bentwaters that supported bombing missions. He finished the war with the rank of squadron leader and remained with the RAF afterwards, operating Gloster Meteors at the head of No. 266 (Rhodesia) Squadron.

Plagis was the top-scoring Southern Rhodesian ace of the war, and the highest-scoring ace of Greek origin, with 16 confirmed aerial victories, including 11 over Malta. Awarded the Distinguished Service Order and other medals, he was also one of Rhodesia's most decorated veterans. The Southern Rhodesian capital, Salisbury, honoured his wartime contributions by naming a street in its northern Alexandra Park neighbourhood after him. On his return home after retiring from the RAF with the rank of wing commander in 1948, he set up home at 1 John Plagis Avenue, opened a bottle store bearing his name, and was a director of several companies, including Central African Airways in the 1960s. He contested the Salisbury City constituency in the 1962 general election, standing for the Rhodesian Front, but failed to win. He died in 1974.

Early life
His parents, Agorastos and Helen Plagis, were Greek immigrants from the island of Lemnos; he had five siblings. Christened with the Greek name Ioannis Agorastos, Plagis used the English form of Ioannis, John, from childhood, and attended Prince Edward School in Salisbury.

Having been interested in aviation since he was a boy, Plagis volunteered for the Southern Rhodesian Air Force (SRAF) soon after the outbreak of war in September 1939. He was turned down because he was the son of foreign nationals and therefore not a citizen, despite having lived in Rhodesia all his life. After Italy invaded Greece in late October 1940, bringing the Greeks into the war on the Allied side, Plagis applied again—this time to join the Royal Air Force, which had absorbed the SRAF in April 1940—and was accepted. Training first in Southern Rhodesia, then England, Plagis passed out with the rank of flight sergeant in June 1941 with above-average ratings in all of his flying assessments.

Though he was officially in the RAF as a Greek (he became a Rhodesian citizen only after the war), Plagis considered himself a Rhodesian flyer and wore shoulder flashes on his uniform denoting him as such. He named each aircraft he piloted during the war after his sister Kay, and painted that name on the side of each cockpit. After briefly flying Spitfires with No. 65 Squadron RAF, Plagis joined No. 266 (Rhodesia) Squadron, an almost all-Rhodesian Spitfire unit, on 19 July 1941. He served in the UK for about half a year, during which he was commissioned as a pilot officer, before being posted to the Mediterranean theatre in January 1942.

Air war in Europe and the Mediterranean

First tour of operations

Plagis's first major operation was Operation Spotter, the first of many British endeavours to reinforce the besieged island of Malta in the face of German and Italian assaults during the Battle of the Mediterranean. Malta was considered to be of vital strategic importance, and its defence was looking increasingly precarious in March 1942. Spotter was a plan to strengthen its British garrison with 16 new Spitfire Mk Vs, which would be carried part of the way from Gibraltar on the aircraft carrier HMS Eagle, then flown to Malta; the pilots would then become part of the severely depleted No. 249 (Gold Coast) Squadron. The team of pilots comprised eight British airmen, four Australians, two New Zealanders and two Southern Rhodesians—Plagis and his close friend Pilot Officer Doug Leggo.

The operation, carried out on 7 March 1942, was largely successful and 15 of the 16 Spitfires reached Malta. Plagis and Leggo arrived to find a third Rhodesian, Flight Officer George "Buck" Buchanan, already attached to the squadron. A further delivery of 16 Spitfires, Operation Picket I, was attempted on 21 March, but this was less successful; only nine of the planes arrived. Thirteen Spitfire reinforcement operations were ultimately launched between March and October 1942, playing a key role in the siege. The Luftwaffe and the Italian Regia Aeronautica meanwhile attempted to bomb Malta into submission, turning the airfields into "a wilderness of craters, the docks ... a shambles, Valletta a mass of broken limestone ..."

The Luftwaffe launched a major attack against key Maltese airfields at dawn on 20 March. Leggo, who had not slept for over 24 hours, returned to the airfield in the early hours having spent the night with a girlfriend. As the German planes approached he was ordered to prepare to fly. Plagis attempted to stop his friend from going, but Leggo insisted on flying, and took off at 08:05 as part of a group of four Spitfires and 12 Hurricanes aiming to intercept a squadron of Messerschmitt Bf 109s. He was soon seen to be flying poorly. A German pilot noticed this and attacked Leggo from close range, seriously damaging his aircraft and forcing him to bail out. Another Bf 109 then swooped and either fired at Leggo or collapsed his parachute with its slipstream, causing him to fall to his death. When Plagis learned what had happened, he was inconsolable, holding himself responsible. In his journal, he vowed to "shoot down ten for Doug—I will too, if it takes me a lifetime".

Plagis shot down his first enemy aircraft on 25 March 1942, and on 1 April achieved four more aerial victories in a single afternoon, thereby becoming the siege of Malta's first Spitfire ace. His downing of four enemies in a few hours won him much praise from superiors and reporters, and contributed to his growing reputation as an aggressive but skilful combat pilot. He was awarded the Distinguished Flying Cross (DFC) on 1 May 1942, the citation noting that he had "destroyed 4 and probably destroyed a further 3 hostile aircraft". "With complete indifference to odds against him, he presses home his attacks with skill and courage," it continued—"He has set an outstanding example."

On 11 May, Plagis attempted to down an Italian Reggiane Re.2001 by flying straight at it to ram it; taking erratic evasive manoeuvres, the Italian aircraft stalled and almost crashed into the sea. Thinking he had downed the enemy, Plagis claimed afterwards to have achieved an aerial victory without firing a shot, but the Italian flight reported no losses. Plagis's Spitfire was lightly hit during this engagement, and the Rhodesian had some luck returning safely; he landed with only three gallons (14 litres) of fuel left. On 16 May, Plagis and an English ace, Pilot Officer Peter Nash, destroyed a Bf 109 for a shared kill that became No. 249 Squadron's 100th victory over Malta. Amid the continuing siege, the need for a major supply convoy to Malta was becoming urgent; the Governor Lord Gort warned Britain in early June that if no supplies came by August, he would have to surrender to prevent a famine.

Plagis was promoted in the field to flight lieutenant on 4 June 1942 and transferred to No. 185 Squadron to command "B" Flight. He shot down two Re.2001s two days later to bring his tally of victories to ten (thereby fulfilling his pledge following Leggo's death), and destroyed a Bf 109 on 7 June. A month later, he received a Bar to his DFC, having been adjudged to have shown "exceptional skill and gallantry in combat ... Undeterred by superior numbers of attacking aircraft, he presses home his attacks with great determination." Plagis left Malta when his tour expired on 7 July 1942, flying first to Gibraltar, then the UK. The British finally delivered vital supplies to Malta on 15 August with Operation Pedestal (known in Malta as the "Santa Marija Convoy").

On arriving in England, Plagis was found to be suffering from malnutrition, scabies and physical and mental fatigue. He briefly convalesced in a nursing home, then spent a year as an instructor in England. He was promoted to probationary flying officer on 1 October 1942.

Second tour of operations
Plagis returned to action in September 1943, when he was appointed commanding officer of No. 64 Squadron, then flying Spitfire Mk VCs over northern France from RAF Coltishall in Norfolk. Plagis downed a Bf 109 over France on 24 September 1943, then a Focke-Wulf Fw 190 on 23 November, and formally received the rank of flight lieutenant on 8 December 1943.

At the start of June 1944, Plagis assumed command of No. 126 (Persian Gulf) Squadron, flying Spitfire Mk IXs that had recently been moved from Malta to assist in the invasion of Normandy. Six of the squadron's planes had been purchased by the Persian Gulf Spitfire Fund, and duly named after the donating sheikdoms; Plagis's aircraft, which he chose because of the large letter "K" on its tail (echoing his sister's name), had "Muscat" painted in English and Arabic script on its side. He added to this a full rendering of "Kay" and other personal decorations.

After leading No. 126 Squadron on raids into Normandy during the Allied invasion, Plagis took part in many of the attacks on German positions in northern France and the Low Countries that followed over the next few months. He was shot down over Arnhem in the Netherlands during Operation Market Garden in September 1944, but suffered only minor injuries and quickly returned to action. He received the Distinguished Service Order on 3 November for his "participat[ion] in very many sorties during which much damage has been inflicted on ... [German] shipping, radio stations, oil storage tanks, power plants and other installations". The citation particularly stressed an engagement in which a small group of Allied fighters led by Plagis had taken on a far superior force of enemy aircraft and shot down five of them, Plagis himself downing two. Plagis was described as "a brave and resourceful leader whose example has proved a rare source of inspiration".

Plagis converted to Mustang IIIs along with the rest of his squadron at RAF Bentwaters in Suffolk during December 1944 and January 1945, and spent the rest of the war flying bomber escort missions at the head of Bentwaters Wing, which included No. 126 Squadron. He was promoted to squadron leader on 28 March 1945. Germany surrendered on 7 May, ending the war in Europe.

Plagis finished the war with a tally of 16 enemy aircraft confirmed destroyed (including two shared victories counted as half a kill each), two shared probably destroyed, six damaged and one shared damaged. This made him Southern Rhodesia's highest-scoring ace of the war, as well as the top-scoring ace of Greek origin. He was one of the most-decorated Southern Rhodesian servicemen of the war.

Post-war service and later life

Plagis stayed with the RAF following the end of hostilities, and from September 1946 to December 1947 commanded No. 266 (Rhodesia) Squadron in England and Germany, flying Gloster Meteor F.3s. He was awarded the Airman's Cross by the government of the Netherlands in October 1946. After retiring from the military with the rank of wing commander, Plagis returned home to Southern Rhodesia in 1948. A street in the north Salisbury suburb of Alexandra Park had been named after him in recognition of his wartime exploits; he moved into the house at the end of the road, 1 John Plagis Avenue. He married in 1954 and had three sons and a daughter.

Plagis set up and ran a bottle store bearing his name in Salisbury, and was involved in several businesses during the next three decades, serving as a director on company boards, including Central African Airways from 1963 to 1968. He joined the Rhodesian Front on its formation in 1962, and was its candidate in Salisbury City in that year's general election, losing to the United Federal Party's John Roger Nicholson by 631 votes to 501. According to a report published by the Zimbabwe African National Union in 1969, Plagis was by then working in the office of the Rhodesian Prime Minister Ian Smith (himself a Second World War Spitfire pilot), with responsibility for the premier's written correspondence.

In later life, Plagis became a friend of British ace Douglas Bader, a prominent supporter of Rhodesia's  Unilateral Declaration of Independence in 1965. Bader, Smith and Plagis often socialised. Plagis also knew L Ron Hubbard, the American founder of Scientology, who briefly relocated to Salisbury in 1966. Hubbard initiated numerous business schemes in Rhodesia, including the purchase of the Bumi Hills Hotel at Kariba. Plagis was one of two local businessmen who partnered with Hubbard in the Bumi Hills deal. He also sold Hubbard an interest in his holdings before the American was deported.

Plagis died in 1974, aged 54 or 55; according to Lauren St John, an author from Gadzema, he had taken his own life, having never truly readjusted to the civilian world.

Notes and references

Footnotes

References

Newspaper and journal articles

Bibliography

 
 
 
 
 
 
 
 
 
 
 
 
 
 
 
 

1919 births
1974 deaths
Date of death missing
Place of death missing
Alumni of Prince Edward School
Companions of the Distinguished Service Order
Greek World War II flying aces
People from Mashonaland West Province
Recipients of the Airman's Cross
Recipients of the Distinguished Flying Cross (United Kingdom)
Rhodesian businesspeople
Rhodesian Front politicians
Royal Air Force wing commanders
Shot-down aviators
Southern Rhodesian World War II flying aces
Suicides in Rhodesia
White Rhodesian people
Rhodesian people of Greek descent
Non-British Royal Air Force personnel of World War II
1974 suicides